La vida alrededor is a 1959 Spanish comedy film written, starred and directed by Fernando Fernán Gómez. The movie follows La vida por delante made by the same crew in 1958.

The film is a satire about the years where housing was scarce and jobs were even scarcer, quite a contrast with the present Spain where life is easier than during the hard years when Franco ruled with an iron fist. Mr. Fernan Gomez plays Antonio, a lawyer who was not a good student and has to resort to schemes to eke a living for himself and the wife.

References

External links

1959 films
1959 comedy films
Films directed by Fernando Fernán Gómez
Spanish comedy films
1950s Spanish-language films
Spanish black-and-white films
Madrid in fiction
Spain in fiction
1950s Spanish films